African Banking Corporation Limited (ABC Bank Kenya) is a Kenyan commercial bank, established in 1984.

In March 2017, ABC acquired the LEI certification from the London Stock Exchange.

History
ABC Bank was started in 1981, as a financial institution named Consolidated Finance Company Limited.

By 1994,following the gazettement of a legislation allowing financial institutions to convert into banks, Consolidated Finance Company immediately transformed, giving rise to African Banking Corporation Limited (ABC Bank) in 1995.

Subsidiaries
ABC Bank (Kenya) owns the following subsidiaries, either in whole or in part:

 ABC Capital Bank, Kampala, Uganda (commercial bank)
 ABC Capital Limited, Nairobi, Kenya (stock brokerage) 
 ABC Insurance Limited, Nairobi, Kenya (insurance brokerage)

See also

 East African Community
 Central Bank of Kenya
 List of banks in Kenya
 Economy of Kenya
 ABC Bank (Uganda)

References

Banks of Kenya
Banks established in 1984
1984 establishments in Kenya